Sojas Rud District is in Khodabandeh County, Zanjan province, Iran. At the 2006 National Census, its population was 27,344 in 6,101 households. The following census in 2011 counted 27,992 people in 7,516 households. At the latest census in 2016, the district had 26,965 inhabitants in 7,939 households.

References 

Khodabandeh County

Districts of Zanjan Province

Populated places in Zanjan Province

Populated places in Khodabandeh County